Som Catalans (SOM; English: "We are Catalans") is a xenophobic and independentist party, active in the Spanish autonomous community of Catalonia and founded in 2014 by Ester Gallego and Enric Ravello, following a scission from Platform for Catalonia.

The party, classified as part of the identitarian movement, maintains relations with other European movements such as Vlaams Belang (Flanders, Belgium), Lega Nord (Italy), Aitheantas Éire (Ireland) and Casal Europa (Northern Catalonia, France).

In the 2015 local elections, the party contested in Vic without obtaining any representation. In the 2019 local elections, the party contested in Llagostera, Sabadell, Sant Feliu de Guíxols and Ripoll without obtaining any representation anywhere.

References 

Far-right political parties in Spain
Political parties in Catalonia
Right-wing populism in Spain
Anti-Islam political parties in Europe
Anti-Islam sentiment in Spain
Political parties established in 2014
Far-right politics in Catalonia
Catalan independence movement
Identitarian movement